Amandinea devilliersiana is a species of crustose lichen in the family Caliciaceae, and found in South Australia. It was first described in 2013 by Australian lichenologists Jack Elix and Gintaras Kantvilas from a specimen collected on a granite boulder near the seashore in South Australia.  The species epithet, devilliersiana, honours Brigitte de Villiers (frequent companion of Gintaras Kantvilas on lichen hunting expeditions). Specimens used for the description came from both Tasmania and South Australia.

References

devilliersiana
Lichen species
Lichens of Australia
Taxa named by John Alan Elix
Taxa named by Gintaras Kantvilas
Lichens described in 2013